Fleet Street is a street on the southside of Dublin, Ireland. Located in the Dublin 2 area, Fleet Street runs eastwards, parallel to the River Liffey, through Temple Bar, across Westmoreland Street to D'Olier Street.

History
The street formerly marked the southern edge of the River Liffey, and was known in Irish as Sráid na Toinne ("street of the waves"). Its name may refer to the "fleet" of ships that moored along it, or it may be imitative of Fleet Street, London; many streets on Dublin's southside are named for London streets, and Dublin's Fleet Street is east of Dublin's Temple Bar, just as London's Fleet Street is east of London's Temple Bar.

In 1902, Irish revolutionary Kevin Barry was born at number 8, Fleet Street, where his father ran a dairy business.

In the 1970s, it was home to Sloopy's, Ireland's first discotheque.

Although a wealthy area, and a centre of furniture-making, Fleet Street went into decline in the 20th century and in the 1980s was set to be demolished, and a bus terminus built in its place. Instead it was revived as a cultural area. Today it is known for its many pubs, cafés and restaurants, including the Hard Rock Cafe, the Oliver St. John Gogarty, Bowes, and The Palace Bar. Fleet Street also contains the Irish HQ of Amnesty International, at Seán MacBride House.

In 2022, travel website The World Bucket List ranked Fleet Street as one of Europe's 15 most beautiful streets, calling it "the capital city’s most bustling street […] A picturesque cobbled street, Fleet Street comes alive at night and encapsulates the craic and hospitality that Ireland is known for."

Cultural references
Fleet Street appears several times in the work of James Joyce: in "The Boarding House" he mentions "Jack Mooney, the Madam’s son, who was clerk to a commission agent in Fleet Street", while in "Counterparts" he mentions "Terry Kelly’s pawn-office in Fleet Street". In Ulysses, Leopold Bloom stands at "Fleet street crossing."

Gallery

See also

List of streets and squares in Dublin

References

Streets in Dublin (city)